Turpan Museum is a museum in Turpan, Xinjiang, China. It has items from the Tang dynasty excavated from the Astana Graves which are located outside the town. Items include ancient silks, clothes and preserved corpses.

See also
 List of museums in China
 Silk Road transmission of Buddhism

References

Archaeological museums in China
Buildings and structures in Turpan
Museums in Xinjiang
National first-grade museums of China